The 2016 EHF European Men's Handball Championship was the twelfth edition and was held for the first time in Poland from 15–31 January 2016. Croatia and Norway were the other applicants in the bidding process.

Poland was awarded the championship on the EHF Congress in Monaco on 23 June 2012 with 58% votes.

Germany won their second title by beating Spain 24–17 in the final. Croatia captured the bronze medal after defeating Norway 31–24.

Venues

Qualification

Qualified teams

Note: Bold indicates champion for that year. Italic indicates host for that year.

Seeding
The seeding was announced on 18 June 2015.

Squads

Match officials
On 30 September 2015, 12 couples were announced.

Group stage
The draw was held on 19 June 2015.

All times are local (UTC+1).

Group A

Group B

Group C

Group D

Main round
The points gained in the preliminary group against teams that advanced were carried over.

Group I

Group II

Knockout stage

Bracket

Semifinals

Seventh place game

Fifth place game

Third place game

Final

Statistics

Final ranking and qualifications

WC = World Championship, OG = Olympic Games

All Star Team

Source

Player's awards

Source

Top goalscorers

Source: handball.sportsresult.com

Top goalkeepers

Source: handball.sportsresults.com

References

External links
Official website

 
2016
European Men's Handball Championship
2016 European Men's Handball Championship
European Men's Handball Championship
Handball Championship
European Men's Handball Championship